Strange Wives is a 1934 American comedy film directed by Richard Thorpe, written by James Mulhauser, Barry Trivers, and Gladys Buchanan Unger, and starring Roger Pryor, June Clayworth, Esther Ralston, Hugh O'Connell, Ralph Forbes, and Cesar Romero. It was released on December 10, 1934, by Universal Pictures.

Plot

Against his better judgment, stockbroker Jimmy King proposes marriage to a Russian refugee called Nadja, promptly complicating his life. He ends up supporting Nadja and all of her family, then must come up with a clever way of getting them all to be self-reliant and out of his house.

Cast

References

External links 
 

1934 films
1930s English-language films
American comedy films
1934 comedy films
Universal Pictures films
Films based on works by Edith Wharton
Films directed by Richard Thorpe
American black-and-white films
1930s American films